Tudor Grange Academy (formally Leys High School and Kingsley College) is a secondary school and sixth form centre in Redditch, Worcestershire, England. As of October 2010 the school has approximately 250 students on roll, of which 28 are in the sixth form.

History
The school began as the Lodge Farm Secondary Modern School, which became the Leys High School when it became comprehensive.

The school was designated a Specialist Arts College in  September 2003 named Kingsley College and sixth form centre.  for the Performing Arts. and became an academy in April 2014.
Tudor Grange Academy Redditch opened in April 2014; the Academy is sponsored by its sister school, Tudor Grange Academy Solihull and the trust now consists of six schools, two primary schools and four secondary schools. The former Principal of Tudor Grange Academy Worcester, Mrs. C Maclean, has now become the Executive Principal for the Trust overseeing all schools.

Partnerships
The school has partnerships with Woodrush High School, the University of Warwick, GKN, Barnardo's and Ican, a language charity.international partnerships with Kwamfundo Secondary in Western Cape, South Africa.

Curriculum
The school offers core subjects and a varied curriculum for Years 7–13, that culminate in GCSE, A and AS level courses, BTEC, and diploma courses.

Notable former pupils
 Joe Lolley

Leys High School
 Nigel Clark, lead singer of Dodgy

Lodge Farm Secondary Modern School
 John Bonham, drummer of Led Zeppelin

References

Upper schools in Worcestershire
Redditch
Academies in Worcestershire